William Waller may refer to:

Sir William Waller (c. 1597–1668), English Parliamentary general during the English Civil War
Sir William Waller (informer) (died 1699), Middlesex justice and politician
William Waller (cricketer) (1923-1998), Trinidadian cricketer
William Waller (footballer) (1898–?), English footballer
Bill Waller (1926–2011), American politician, Governor of Mississippi, 1972–1976
Bill Waller (American football) (1911–2007), head football coach for the Southern Illinois Salukis
William L. Waller Jr. (born 1952), former Chief Justice of the Supreme Court of Mississippi and candidate for governor in 2019